Uranian may refer to:


Sexuality
Uranian (sexology), a historical term for homosexual men
Uranians, a group of male homosexual poets

Astronomy
Uranian, of or pertaining to the planet Uranus
Uranian system, refers to the 27 moons of Uranus

Mythology and fiction
Uranian, relating to Aphrodite Urania, an epithet of the Greek goddess Aphrodite
Uranian, relating to Urania, the muse of astronomy
Uranian (comics), a fictional race in the Marvel Universe

Other uses
Uranian Phalanstery, artist collectives in New York City
For Uranian astrology see Hamburg School of Astrology

See also
Urania (disambiguation)
Uranus (disambiguation)